The 2021 Channel One Cup was the 54th edition of the tournament. It was played between 15 and 19 December 2021. Canada, Czech Republic, Finland, Sweden and Russia played in the tournament. Seven of the matches were played in the CSKA Arena in Moscow, Russia, and one match in the O2 Arena in Prague, Czech Republic. The tournament was part of 2021–22 Euro Hockey Tour. It was won by Finland, the third time in tournament history, with a 3–2 overtime win over Russia.

In the game against Finland, Russia played with replica Soviet jerseys. This act was criticized by former Finnish Prime Minister Alexander Stubb, who referred to the Soviet Union being a totalitarian state.

Standings

Games

References

Channel
Channel
Channel
Channel
Channel
Channel One Cup (ice hockey)
2021 in Moscow
2020s in Prague
Sports competitions in Prague